Seven Minds is the fourth studio album by American jazz bassist Sam Jones together with Billy Higgins on drums and Cedar Walton on piano. The album was recorded and initially released in 1975 in Japan via East Wind label. Masaya Katsura Strings Quartet is featured on tracks 2, 4, and 6. Later the album was re-released on CD in 2002 and 2015.

Reception

Ken Dryden of Allmusic awarded the album 4 stars and wrote "Sam Jones led quite a few valuable dates as a leader, though this East Wind album, recorded and released in Japan, may be not be at all familiar to his fans. Joined by Cedar Walton and Billy Higgins, Jones offers three originals, starting with a choice interpretation of the smoking 'Blues for Amos.' His intense 'Seven Minds' (which suggests the influence of John Coltrane) borders on avant-garde and the delightful ballad 'Miss Morgan' features a formidable opening solo by the leader. The pianist contributed 'Holy Land,' a somewhat gospel-flavored work that adds the Masaya Katsura String Quartet".

Track listing

Personnel
Sam Jones – bass 
Billy Higgins – drums
Cedar Walton – piano
Masaya Katsura Strings Quartet (tracks 2, 4, and 6)

References 

Sam Jones (musician) albums
1975 albums
East Wind Records albums